Gloria Hope (born Olive Frances, November 9, 1901 – October 29, 1976) was an American silent film actress.

Life and career

She was born as Olive Frances  in Pittsburgh, Pennsylvania, in 1901. Following her education at a Newark, New Jersey, school, she entered upon her career as a screen player and played successively with Ince, Triangle, Artcraft, Ince Paramount, Paralta, Universal and Goldwyn. Naughty, Naughty, The Gay Lord Quex, Burglar by Proxy, The Hushed Hour, The Great Love, and Outcasts of Poker Flat were a few of the many screen plays she appeared in.

She was signed in 1917 and starred in about 30 films before her retirement in 1926 at age 25 to have children.

She starred with William Garwood in films such as The Guilty Man in 1918, and with Mary Pickford and Lloyd Hughes in Tess of the Storm Country in 1922.

She married Lloyd Hughes on June 30, 1921, and they had children Donald and Isabel. On October 11, 1927, she married Joe Bishow, but the marriage was annulled in 1928.

Hope died in Pasadena, California. She is interred at Glendale's Forest Lawn Memorial Park Cemetery, near Hughes.

Filmography

1920s
 Sandy (1926) .... Judith Moore
That Devil Quemado (1925) .... Joanna Thatcher
Tess of the Storm Country (1922) .... Teola Graves
Trouble (1922) .... Mrs. Lee, the Plumber's Wife
 The Grim Comedian (1921) .... Dorothy
 Courage (1921) .... Eve Hamish
 Colorado (1921) .... Kitty Doyle
Prairie Trails (1920) .... Alice Endicott
The Texan (1920) .... Alice Marcum
Seeds of Vengeance (1920) .... Mary Reddin
 The Desperate Hero (1920) .... Mabel Darrow
The Third Woman (1920) .... Marcelle Riley

1910s
Too Much Johnson (1919) .... Leonora Faddish
 The Gay Lord Quex (1919) .... Muriel Eden
Rider of the Law (1919) .... Betty
Burglar by Proxy (1919) .... Dorothy Mason
The Outcasts of Poker Flat (1919) .... Ruth Watson/Sophy, the girl
Bill Apperson's Boy (1919) .... Martha Yarton
The Hushed Hour (1919) .... Annie Vierge
The Heart of Rachael (1918) .... Magsie Clay
The Law of the North (1918) .... Virginie de Montcalm
The Great Love (1918) .... Jessie Lovewell
$5,000 Reward (1918) .... Margaret Hammersley
Free and Equal (1918) .... Margaret Lowell
Naughty, Naughty! (1918) .... Judith Holmes
The Guilty Man (1918) .... Claudine Flambon
 Time Locks and Diamonds (1917) .... Marjory Farrel

References

External links

 
 
 Gloria Hope at Virtual History

American film actresses
Actresses from Pittsburgh
American silent film actresses
1901 births
1976 deaths
20th-century American actresses
Burials at Forest Lawn Memorial Park (Glendale)